The Gauribidanur Radio Observatory is a radio telescope observatory located at Gauribidanur, near Bengaluru. It is operated jointly by Raman Research Institute and the Indian Institute of Astrophysics. The observatory has been in operation since 1976.

Location
The Gauribidanur Observatory is located at Gauribidanur kolar district (Latitude:13.60° N; Longitude:77.44° E), 100 km north of Bengaluru.

Science and observation
The Observatory has been used for studying various aspects of the Sun, galaxies and pulsars.

A few observations with the array have been the first two-dimensional images of radio emission from slowly varying discrete sources in the outer solar corona, an all-sky survey of radio sources at 34.5 MHz in the declination range -30° S to 60° N, and a low frequency carbon recombination lines in astrophysical sources. Studies have also been done of gaseous remnants of exploding stars and the apparently vacant space between members of a cluster of galaxies. Currently, the studies are targeted at pulsars.

Facilities
The Gauribidanur Observatory has a 6-meter radio telescope, a radio heliograph, a high resolution radio spectrograph and a gravitational laboratory.

Gauribidanur Telescope
The Gauribidanur Telescope is a decameter wave radio telescope. It consists of 1000 dipoles arranged in a "T" configuration. It consists of 1.4 km East-West Arm and a 0.5 km South Arm.

Gauribidanur Radio Heliograph
The Gauribidanur Radio Heliograph is a radioheliograph used to obtain two dimensional pictures of the outer solar corona at frequencies from 40-150 MHz. It has been operating since 1997. It consists of 192 log-periodic dipoles arranged in a "T" configuration.

See also
 List of astronomical observatories

References

Astronomical observatories in India
Buildings and structures in Chikkaballapur district
Science and technology in Karnataka
Indian Institute of Astrophysics
1976 establishments in Karnataka
Radio observatories